Son of Dracula can refer to: 

 Son of Dracula (1943 film), a 1943 horror film starring Lon Chaney Jr.
 Son of Dracula (1974 film), a 1974 film starring Harry Nilsson and Ringo Starr, as well as a soundtrack album of the same title